Marble Hill is an unincorporated community in Jefferson County, Indiana, in the United States.

History
A post office was established at Marble Hill in 1889, and remained in operation until it was discontinued in 1921. The community took its name from a hill where marble was quarried.

References

Unincorporated communities in Jefferson County, Indiana
Unincorporated communities in Indiana